Healthcare real estate is a niche market within the larger real estate industry. Healthcare real estate or "medical real estate" describes buildings, offices, and campuses leased to members or organizations within the healthcare community.  These buildings can be owned by hospitals, health systems or private or public third party groups.  There is a rising trend among hospitals, health care systems, and medical practitioners to embrace third party ownership and management of real estate.  By using third party developers, they can preserve their capital resources for acute care needs and focus their attention on helping people, while passing on responsibility of building regulation and maintenance minutiae.

Differentiation
Healthcare facilities have detailed technological and regulatory requirements.  Even such building maintenance tasks as cleaning, heating, and cooling are done differently in health care, with demanding sterilization and filtration needs.  In addition to outsourcing building and management tasks, it's becoming increasingly attractive for hospitals to leave building ownership itself to someone else. The concept fits well with the current US development trend pairing not-for-profit hospitals with for-profit physician groups as partners in new specialty facilities. Illinois, Texas, California, and Florida accounted for a third of healthcare construction starts in 2007, though the practice of third party ownership is also rising among all metropolitan areas where space is at a premium.

From an investor viewpoint, healthcare REITs as a group generally trade at a premium yield to other REIT categories. It is also considered one of the more stable sectors, along with higher education and government. During times of economic decline, health care real estate continues to grow.

Factors 
In 2008, several factors converged to drive healthcare real estate:

An aging population that requires ever more medical services: As of 2004, there were 36.3 million people in America 65 and older, accounting for 12% of total population. US Census projects there will be 86.7 million people 65 and older by 2050, comprising 21% of the total population.
Advances in technology that allow increasing numbers of medical procedures to be done in offices outside of a hospital setting
Tight medical office markets in many areas as little new construction came on line for several years
Rapid population growth in some areas that has outstripped the supply of medical offices
Increasing interest from investors looking to take advantage of high lease rates and a generally stable physician tenant base.

There have been growth in medical office development through 2015. By the end of 2015, it is estimated that 8.8 million square feet of medical office space will have been developed across the United States. In 2014, 7.1 million square feet was developed across the country.

References

Commercial real estate
Health care industry